The Guam women's national volleyball team represents Guam in international women's volleyball competitions and friendly matches.

The team appeared at the Pacific Games several times.

References
Guam Volleyball Federation

National women's volleyball teams
Volleyball
Volleyball in Guam
Women's sports in Guam